The Wright GB Kite is a range of full-size zero-emission single-deck buses manufactured by Wrightbus since 2022. Similar in body style to the diesel powered Wright GB Hawk, the GB Kite is an integral design that can be built as a battery electric vehicle, the Electroliner BEV, and as a fuel cell electric vehicle, the Hydroliner FCEV.

The GB Kite range was launched in September 2021, following the launch of the double-deck Wright StreetDeck Electroliner and Hydroliner range earlier in the year. Regular production of both GB Kite variants was fully underway by December 2022.

Orders

Hydroliner FCEV
The first orders for GB Kites was placed in November 2021, with Metrobus ordering 20 Hydroliner FCEV vehicles for use on the Fastway network, to be delivered in late 2022. 

60 left-hand drive Hydroliner FCEVs have been ordered by Cologne municipal operator , Wrightbus' first European order since the bus builder was rescued from bankruptcy, with deliveries of the Hydroliners to take place between 2023 and 2025.

In May 2022, Wrightbus entered a deal to supply the Australian bodybuilder Volgren with two GB Kite Hydroliner chassis for the company to body. These two buses are scheduled to enter service with Transdev Queensland for hydrogen fuel-cell trial services in Brisbane in 2023.

Electroliner BEV
28 Electroliners are expected to enter service with the Foyle Metro in 2023 as part of an investment by Translink for 38 battery electric Wright buses for Derry. 50 more have been ordered for delivery to both Ulsterbus and Metro in Belfast in summer 2024.

The FirstGroup has ordered 173 GB Kite Electroliners for five of its subsidiaries as part of an order placed in August 2022 which also included 20 StreetDeck Electroliners. GB Kite Electroliners are to be delivered to First York and First West Yorkshire, First Leicester, First Eastern Counties and First Hampshire & Dorset for services in Leeds, York, Leicester, Norwich and Portsmouth respectively. A further 28 GB Kite Electroliners were ordered for First Hampshire & Dorset's Hoeford depot in March 2023.

The Oxford Bus Company is to receive five GB Kite Electroliners as part of a 104-vehicle order for zero-emission Wrightbus bsues.

References

Single-deck buses
Low-floor buses
Battery electric buses
Fuel cell buses
Vehicles introduced in 2021
GB Kite